Charles Villa-Vicencio is an Emeritus Professor of Religious Studies at the University of Cape Town. He is also a Visiting research professor at Georgetown University. He was a director of the Truth and Reconciliation Commission which organised the public hearings on the atrocities committed during apartheid.

Career
He was Professor of Religion and Society at the University of Cape Town. He is presently an Emeritus Professor of that university. He was the National Research Director in the South African Truth and Reconciliation Commission.

A regular contributor to debate in South Africa, his present work is largely in the area of transitional justice. He is currently worked, or has worked, in countries with fractious societies ripped apart by civil war or ethnic strife. These range from the Basque separatist movement, Peru, Sri Lanka, Colombia, and other African countries.

He is a senior research fellow in the Institute for Justice and Reconciliation which he founded in 2000 after his gig at the TRC.

Publications

Journal articles

Books

References

External links
South Africa Today: Did the Mandela Revolution Succeed?
Charles Villa-Vicencio on The Conversation
"A Truth and Reconciliation Story," Dr. Charles Villa Vicencio

Truth and Reconciliation Commission (South Africa) people
Academic staff of the University of Cape Town